The Aberdare National Park is a protected area in the Aberdare Mountain Range in central Kenya located east of the East African Rift Valley. It covers the higher areas and the Aberdare Salient to the east.

Overview 
Established in May 1950, the Aberdare National Park covers an area of 766 square kilometers and forms part of the Aberdare Mountain Range. Moorland, bamboo forests and rainforests are found at lower altitudes.

History 
Aberdare National Park was established in 1950 with an aim to conserve and protect the Aberdare Mountains. Since then it has grown to a size of an area of 767 km.

Aberdare National Park is best known as the site where in 1952, Princess Elizabeth became Queen after the death of her father King George VI, whilst staying at the Treetops Hotel.

Wildlife 

Wildlife present in the protected area include lion, leopard, elephant, East African wild dog, giant forest hog, bushbuck, mountain reedbuck, waterbuck, Cape buffalo, suni, side-striped jackal, eland, duiker, olive baboon, black and white colobus monkey, and sykes monkey. Rarer sightings include those of the African golden cat and the bongo. Species such as the common eland, serval live in the higher moorlands. The Aberdare National Park also hosts a large eastern black rhinoceros population and over 250 bird species including the endangered Aberdare cisticola, Jackson's spurfowl, sparrowhawk, African goshawk, African fish eagle, sunbirds and plovers.

Facilities 
Visitors to the park can find different types of accommodation, from the Treetops lodge, to the Ark - built in the shape of Noah's Ark - and three self-help banda sites, eight special campsites and a public campsite in the moorland. There are also five picnic sites. Both Treetops and The Ark provide excellent nighttime wildlife viewing. Animals seen include Elephants, Cape buffalo, and rhino, which come to the waterholes. The park also includes two airstrips at Mweiga and Nyeri.

Park entry and charges 
The park is open daily from 6:00 am to 7:00 pm. Entry on foot is prohibited and visitors are turned away after 6:15 pm.
Entry to the park is by smart card only, obtained and loaded at the main gate.

References

External links 

 Kenya Wildlife Service – Aberdare National Park
 
 United Nations Environmental Programme - Aberdare Range Forests 
 Kenyalogy - Aberdares
 Rhino Ark - a charity for the conservation of the Aberdare National Park, "Humans in harmony with habitat and wildlife"

National parks of Kenya
Great Rift Valley
Protected areas established in 1950
Central Province (Kenya)
Nature conservation in Kenya
Nyandarua County
Nyeri County